Bonton may refer to:

Bonton, Dallas, neighborhood in Dallas, Texas
Bonton Group, a media/entertainment holding company
A brand name for Lorazepam

See also 
Bon Ton (disambiguation)